Otuoke is a suburb in Ogbia local government area of Bayelsa State in the Niger Delta region of Nigeria. Majority of its inhabitants are farmers and fishermen.

Notable people
 Goodluck Ebele Jonathan

Higher institutions
 Federal University Otuoke

References

Populated places in Bayelsa State